Transcendental Étude No. 2 in A minor, "Molto Vivace", or Fusées (French: “Rockets”) is the 2nd piece of the Transcendental Études by Franz Liszt. The title Fusées is not Liszt's own, but was added by Ferruccio Busoni in his edition of the Études, referring to the right hand figures that leap off the keyboard, giving impressions of rockets going off. It is a study in alternating hands, hands overlapping, both hands playing the same note alternatingly, and steep right hand leaps. When played at the directed tempo, it is regarded as one of the more difficult études in the set.

Form
This piece is an extremely volatile one as fierce alternating notes in fortissimo fire away. Soon the notes alternate even more fiercely, followed by a flying right hand arpeggio accompanied by long arpeggiated chords. Then new difficulties are introduced as the right hand jumps high up the keyboard and returns firmly, offsetting a set of same note left hand- right hand alternations. As the climax of the piece approaches it crescendos and plays even fiercer low pitched notes, and soon the right hand figures explode with erratic chords that climb high up to the keyboard and then back down. The climax then ensues as both hands alternate on the same notes that climb 5 octaves up the keyboard and down again, then fires up again and down again. Then the right hand arpeggios recapitulate and the right hand flies even higher and steeper. After a few more loud chords, the piece finally relents.

External links 
 

Transcendental 02
1852 compositions
Compositions in A minor